Moldenhawer may refer to:

 Johann Jacob Paul Moldenhawer (1766–1827). German botanist.
 Daniel Gotthilf Moldenhawer (1753–1823). German-Danish philologist, theologian and librarian.